Árpád Baróti (born 23 October 1991) is a Hungarian professional volleyball player, a member of the Hungary national team.

Honours
 CEV Cup
  2015/2016 – with Berlin Recycling Volleys
 National championships
 2015/2016  German Championship, with Berlin Recycling Volleys
 2015/2016  German Cup, with Berlin Recycling Volleys
 2016/2017  KOVO Cup, with Suwon KEPCO Vixtorm
 2019/2020  Polish SuperCup, with ZAKSA Kędzierzyn-Koźle

References

External links
 
 Player profile at LegaVolley.it 
 Player profile at PlusLiga.pl 
 Player profile at Volleybox.net

1991 births
Living people
People from Bonyhád
Sportspeople from Tolna County
Hungarian men's volleyball players
Hungarian expatriate sportspeople in Italy
Expatriate volleyball players in Italy
Hungarian expatriate sportspeople in South Korea
Expatriate volleyball players in South Korea
Hungarian expatriate sportspeople in Germany
Expatriate volleyball players in Germany
Hungarian expatriate sportspeople in France
Expatriate volleyball players in France
Hungarian expatriate sportspeople in Poland
Expatriate volleyball players in Poland
Hungarian expatriate sportspeople in Turkey
Expatriate volleyball players in Turkey
Hungarian expatriate sportspeople in Japan
Expatriate volleyball players in Japan
ZAKSA Kędzierzyn-Koźle players
Jastrzębski Węgiel players
Opposite hitters